Omega Tribe may refer to:

 Omega Tribe (British band)
 Omega Tribe (Japanese band)